The 2019 Auckland Open (sponsored by ASB Bank) was a joint ATP and WTA tennis tournament, played on outdoor hard courts. It was the 34th edition of the women's event, and the 43rd edition of the men's event. It took place at the ASB Tennis Centre in Auckland, New Zealand, from 31 December 2018 to 6 January 2019 for the women, and from 7 to 12 January 2019 for the men.

Points and prize money

Point distribution

Prize money 

1 Qualifiers' prize money is also the Round of 32 prize money
* per team

ATP singles main-draw entrants

Seeds 

1 Rankings as of December 31, 2018.

Other entrants 
The following players received wildcards into the singles main draw:
  David Ferrer
  Cameron Norrie
  Rubin Statham

The following players received entry from the qualifying draw:
  Ugo Humbert 
  Bradley Klahn 
  Maximilian Marterer 
  Mackenzie McDonald

The following players received entry as lucky losers:
  Pablo Cuevas
  Laslo Đere

Withdrawals
Before the tournament
  Roberto Bautista Agut → replaced by  Laslo Đere
  Pierre-Hugues Herbert → replaced by  Tennys Sandgren
  Gaël Monfils → replaced by  Pablo Cuevas

Retirements
  Laslo Đere
  David Ferrer

ATP doubles main-draw entrants

Seeds 

1 Rankings as of December 31, 2018.

Other entrants 
The following pairs received wildcards into the doubles main draw:
  Cameron Norrie /  Rubin Statham
  Ajeet Rai /  George Stoupe

The following pair received entry as alternates:
  Philipp Oswald /  Tim Pütz

Withdrawals 
Before the tournament
  Pablo Cuevas

WTA singles main-draw entrants

Seeds 

1 Rankings as of December 24, 2018

Other entrants 
The following players received wildcards into the singles main draw:
  Amanda Anisimova
  Lauren Davis
  Bethanie Mattek-Sands

The following players received entry from the qualifying draw:
  Bianca Andreescu 
  Jana Čepelová 
  Bibiane Schoofs 
  Sílvia Soler Espinosa

The following player received entry as a lucky loser:
  Laura Siegemund

Withdrawals
Before the tournament
  Rebecca Peterson → replaced by  Taylor Townsend
  Markéta Vondroušová → replaced by  Laura Siegemund

Retirements
  Jana Čepelová (right thoracic injury)
  Alison Van Uytvanck (left ankle injury)

WTA doubles main-draw entrants

Seeds 

1 Rankings as of December 24, 2018

Other entrants 
The following pairs received wildcards into the doubles main draw:
  Paige Mary Hourigan /  Taylor Townsend 
  Valentina Ivanov /  Elys Ventura

Withdrawals 
During the tournament
  Laura Siegemund (lower leg soreness)

Champions

Men's singles 

  Tennys Sandgren def.  Cameron Norrie, 6–4, 6–2

Women's singles 

  Julia Görges def.  Bianca Andreescu 2–6, 7–5, 6–1

Men's doubles 

  Ben McLachlan /  Jan-Lennard Struff def.  Raven Klaasen /  Michael Venus, 6–3, 6–4

Women's doubles 

  Eugenie Bouchard /  Sofia Kenin def.  Paige Mary Hourigan /  Taylor Townsend, 1–6, 6–1, [10–7]

References

External links 
 

2019 ATP Tour
2019 WTA Tour
2019
2019
ASB
January 2019 sports events in New Zealand
2019 in New Zealand tennis